Chichali Ahmad (also Romanized as Chīchālī Aḩmad; also known as Chichali, Chīchālī Bāle, and Chīchālī Do) is a village in Ben Moala Rural District, in the Central District of Shush County, Khuzestan Province, Iran. At the 2006 census, its population was 112, in 18 families.

References 

Populated places in Shush County